Aha Bushi (Japanese and Kunigami: 安波節, Ahabushi) is an Ryukyuan folk song native to the Yanbaru region of Okinawa Island, Japan. It is sung in the Kunigami language, one of the six Ryukyuan languages.

It is often used as a starting song for beginners in sanshin due to its recognizable rhythm and slow pacing.

Lyrics

In popular culture 
Numerous musicians have performed covers of Aha Bushi, including Ryukyuan-Hawaiian activist Rob Kajiwara.

See also 
 Ryukyuan music
 Okinawan music
 Sanshin

References 

Okinawan music
Ryukyuan culture
Ryukyuan music
Ryukyuan folk songs